Salade cauchoise is a traditional potato and celery salad of the cuisine of the Pays de Caux, Normandy, France. Other ingredients sometimes used include diced ham, diced gruyere and walnut kernels. It seasoned with a Norman cider vinegar and cream dressing.

See also
 List of salads

References

Potato dishes
Salads
Norman cuisine
French cuisine